Kosovo Independence Day is a national independence day celebrated in Kosovo every 17 February.

Background 

Kosovo is the second youngest country in the world (behind South Sudan which declared independence in 2011) and the youngest country in Europe to have been recognized (partially by over 100 UN member states). After a 2008 referendum, Kosovo declared Independence on 17 February 2008. However, Serbia didn't like the partial recognition of Kosovo as an independent state and neither did some other nations including Russia (an ally of Serbia). After the controversy, the UN court (ICJ) ruled out on 22 July 2010 that Kosovo did not violate international law.

See also
Statehood Day (Serbia)
Culture of Kosovo

References 

Independence days
February observances